The 2017 CAF Champions League Final was the final of the 2017 CAF Champions League, the 53rd edition of Africa's premier club football tournament organized by the Confederation of African Football (CAF), and the 21st edition under the current CAF Champions League title.

The final was contested in two-legged home-and-away format between Al Ahly of Egypt and Wydad AC of Morocco. The first leg was hosted by Al Ahly at the Borg El Arab Stadium in Alexandria on 28 October 2017, while the second leg was hosted by Wydad AC at the Stade Mohammed V in Casablanca on 4 November 2017. The winner earned the right to represent the CAF at the 2017 FIFA Club World Cup, entering at the quarterfinal stage, as well as play in the 2018 CAF Super Cup against the winner of the 2017 CAF Confederation Cup.

After the first leg ended in a 1–1 draw, Wydad AC defeated Al Ahly 1–0 in the second leg to win 2–1 on aggregate, and were crowned African champions for the second time.

Teams

In the following table, finals until 1996 were in the African Cup of Champions Club era, since 1997 were in the CAF Champions League era.

Al-Ahly is the most successful club with 8 titles reaching a total of eleven finals, winning eight (1982, 1987, 2001, 2005, 2006, 2008, 2012,
2013) and losing two (1983, 2007).

Wydad AC had reached the final of the African Cup of Champions Clubs twice, winning one in 1992 and losing another in 2011. They were the first Moroccan side to reach the final of Africa's premier club championship since 2011 and also the only Moroccan side to reach this round since 2002 after Raja CA.

Venues

Borg El Arab Stadium

The Borg Elarab stadium is a stadium commissioned in 2006 in the Mediterranean Sea resort of Borg elarab; 25 km west of Alexandria, Egypt. It is the largest stadium in Egypt and the second largest in Africa (after FNB Stadium in Johannesburg) with a capacity of 86,000 and is an all-seater. It is also the 27th largest stadium in the world, and the 9th largest association football stadium in the world. It is located on the Cairo-Alexandria desert highway 10 km from Borg Elarab Airport and 15 km from Alexandria's city centre. A running track runs around the pitch, and the ground has four large floodlights. Only one stand is covered by a roof.

The stadium is 145 feddans, is surrounded by a fence which is 3 km long, an internal road network its long is 6 km, a parking lot which could fit 5000 cars and 200 bus beside an airstrip, there are 136 electronic entrances. The main cabin is covered by an umbrella which covers 35% of the stadium total area, and it is considered the biggest umbrella in the Middle East. Its length is 200 m, its dimension is 60 m and its area is 12,000 m2, which is equal to 3 feddans.

The stadium is air-conditioned and that condition includes the clothes chambers, the salons and entrances, also the stadium includes 8 elevators for broadcasters, handicapped, services and important persons. There are 2 sub-stadiums for training and each ground can hold 2000 spectators, includes 2 locker rooms and a stadium for Athletics. The stadium also includes a hotel for 200 guests which is air-conditioned and has a swimming pool, gym and a department building which contains 80 people. The stadium includes a building which contains 300 presses. This building includes cabinets for broadcasters, entrances for emergency, ambulance cars, 39 and cafeterias, 337 bathrooms which classified to 33 bathrooms for women and 8 bathrooms for the handicapped.

Stade Mohammed V

The Stade Mohammed V is part of a big athletic complex situated in the heart of the city of Casablanca, Morocco, in the western part of Casablanca district. It was inaugurated March 6, 1955, and currently has a capacity of 67,000.

The stadium's record attendance of 100,000 was set in 1997, in a football match between Raja CA and their rivals Wydad AC. 

Often hosting the games of the Morocco national football team, the Mohammed V Stadium is equally known as the home of Wydad AC and Raja CA. It is named after King Mohammed V of Morocco.

Road to the final

Note: In all results below, the score of the finalist is given first (H: home; A: away).

Format
The final was played on a home-and-away two-legged basis, with the order of legs decided by an additional draw held after the group stage draw, which was held on 26 April 2017. If the aggregate score was tied after the second leg, the away goals rule would be applied, and if still tied, extra time would not be played, and the penalty shoot-out would be used to determine the winner (Regulations III. 26 & 27).

Matches

First leg
Amine Atouchi (Wydad AC) missed the first leg after picking up a red card in the second leg of their semi-final against USM Alger.

Zakaria scored for Al Ahly in the third minute after he received a pass outside the penalty area before quickly unleashing a shot with his left foot into the back of the net. Wydad AC then replied with a goal of their own when Ounajem broke through on the right flank and delivered a ball for Bencharki to head in the equaliser.

Second leg
Both sides were without some key players through injury for the decisive match. Mohamed Ounajem (Wydad AC) strained his thigh during the first leg and Ali Maâloul (Al Ahly) was also out with groin injuries.

In the second leg, El Karti scored for Wydad AC the winning goal with a header in the 69th minute from a precise cross delivered by Bencharki.

See also
2017 CAF Confederation Cup Final
2018 CAF Super Cup

References

External links
Total Champions League 2017, CAFonline.com

2017
Final
CCL
CCL
CAF Champions League
CAF Champions League